The Equestrian monument to General Manuel Belgrano is a landmark of Buenos Aires, Argentina. It is located at Plaza de Mayo, in front of the Casa Rosada. It depicts General Manuel Belgrano holding the Flag of Argentina, and it is made of bronze over a pedestal of granite.

History
In 1870 generals Bartolomé Mitre, Enrique Martínez and Manuel José Guerrico appointed a commission with the task of making a monument for Manuel Belgrano. This was requested to the French sculptor Louis-Robert Carrier-Belleuse, who would make the statue of Belgrano, and Manuel de Santa Coloma, who designed the horse. It was finished in 1872 and moved to Buenos Aires, where it was dedicated on September 24, 1873, at an anniversary of the Battle of Tucumán. More than 20,000 people were present at the ceremony, and the Argentine National Anthem was played at Teatro Colón that night. 

During the government of Marcelo Torcuato de Alvear it was thought that the base was too low, so it was raised. During the work the monument was rotated as well, and instead of watching towards to Buenos Aires Cabildo it was made to look to the North, so that it didn't show his back to the Casa Rosada.

Gallery

See also
 Manuel Belgrano
 Plaza de Mayo

Statues of people of the Spanish American wars of independence
Monuments and memorials in Buenos Aires
Equestrian statues in Argentina
Statues of politicians
Statues of military officers
Manuel Belgrano
1873 establishments in Argentina